This is a list of films which placed number one at the weekend box office for the year 2012 in Japan.

Highest-grossing films

See also
 List of Japanese films of 2012
 List of American films — American films by year

References

Japan
2012
2012 in Japanese cinema